Death Metal is a fictional character appearing in American comic books published by Marvel Comics. The character appears in the Marvel UK imprint. He first appeared in Death³ #1 and was created by Dan Abnett and Dell Barras.

Fictional character biography
Death Metal was created by Doctor Evelyn Necker as part of the Minion project which also produced Death's Head II and Death Wreck. Necker had sent Death Wreck throughout space and time, and he came back with (among other things) a magical semi-living metal that she called "Promethium" (not to be confused with the real element promethium). Necker used this metal to create a new cyborg, but she was unaware that the Prometheium had been created by the evil being called Charnel (with whom Dr. Necker had had previous dealings) and Death Metal promptly stole a time machine and fled to the parallel universe of Charnel.

There he was found by the alternate versions of several mainstream Marvel Universe supervillains, whom he killed, and several alternate versions of several superheroes, whom he tried to kill. However, Death's Head and Death Wreck also arrived in Charnel's universe and wound up fighting Death Metal along with the heroes. When that universe's Ghost Rider used his mystical Penance Stare on Death Metal, it caused him to see his own sins and realize the extent of Charnel's evil. The three cyborg "brothers" then teamed up and defeated Charnel.

Death Metal was then thrown through a temporal warp to modern-day Earth. After going on a disoriented violent rampage in Toronto, he encountered a being called Argon, a warrior of pure spirit who had been sent from another dimension to end the threat of Death Metal. Death Metal absorbed Argon's mind and spirit, only to find that his purity counteracted Death Metal's violent rage. Now seeing himself as a monster, he began to seek his own death.

Alpha Flight
When the superhero team Alpha Flight arrived in response to his rampage, he attempted to escalate the fight so that he might be killed. Unfortunately, this only restored his berserker rage, until Aurora used her light powers to calm him. Realizing he was still a danger to others, he teleported away (Death Metal #2 and Death Metal vs Genetix #1).

In Death Metal vs. Genetix, Death Metal sought to create a being that could destroy him. He took cell samples from Alpha Flight's Madison Jeffries and Genetix's Vesper (both of whom could control technology) and created an embryo which he surgically implanted in empath Krista Marwan. Genetix rescued Krista, who inexplicably vowed to have the child.

References

External links 
Death Metal at the Appendix to the Handbook of the Marvel Universe
 

Comics characters introduced in 1993
Marvel UK titles
Marvel Comics characters with superhuman strength
Marvel Comics supervillains
Marvel Comics robots
Characters created by Dan Abnett